Frances Julia  Wedgwood (6 February 1833 – 26 November 1913), also known as Florence Dawson, was an English feminist whose writing spanned philosophy, fiction, biography, history, religious studies and literary criticism.  She was described as "a young woman of extreme passions and fastidious principles" and "at once a powerful reasoner and an inexorable critic of reason".

Life and career

Childhood
Frances Julia Wedgwood was the daughter and the eldest of the six children of Hensleigh Wedgwood and his wife, Frances Emma Elizabeth "Fanny" Mackintosh, daughter of Sir James Mackintosh.  She was a great-granddaughter of the potter Josiah Wedgwood and niece of Charles Darwin. Her strong intellect was apparent early and she taught herself Latin, Greek, French, German and drawing, however her only formal education was at the age of 13 at Rachel Martineau's school in Liverpool. Her mother ran a salon in Cumberland Place attended by Macaulay, Thackeray, F. D. Maurice, Ruskin, and Carlyle.

Early career and fictional works
Wedgwood was acknowledged as "the cleverest of her generation" in the extended Wedgwood–Darwin–Mackintosh family and she acquired renown as a "brilliant conversationalist with a passion for scientific and theological debate". In her twenties she wrote the novels "An Old Debt" and "Framleigh Hall" addressing "intellectual conflict, confused gender roles, and ill-starred sexual passion", which were well received by the public. Faced with her father's disapproval of her writing skills and topics, however, Wedgwood abandoned a third novel despite encouragement by Mrs Gaskell, whom she assisted in research for The Life of Charlotte Brontë (published in 1857). She concluded that "she had no imaginative powers" and that her "mind was 'merely analytical'".

Father-daughter relationship 
In existing accounts of the relationship between Hensleigh Wedgwood and his eldest daughter Julia, the former has been presented as the archetypal austere and bullying Victorian father who had little regard for his daughter’s emotional well-being, or for her position in society as an intellectual woman in her own right. However, a recent account of the relationship challenges this prevailing reading and shows the father-daughter relationship in a more nuanced light than has been given credit.

Obstacles and non-fictional works
Due to expectations on an unmarried woman in a large family, and by her chronic deafness, Wedgwood's work was severely impeded. "Her reading and writing were done between five and seven in the morning" and most of her life was spent caring for ill relatives and for relatives' children. She published some book reviews while caring for a brother, then in 1860-1861 a two-part philosophical dialogue on the theological significance of On the Origin of Species. She argued that evolution was compatible with Christianity. In response, her uncle Charles Darwin wrote her, stating "I must tell you how much I admire your Article (...) I think that you understand my book perfectly, and that I find a very rare event with my critics". She was a close friend of Robert Browning for some years, correspondence with whom survives for the years 1863 to 1870.

In 1870, Wedgwood published a much lauded book on the life and historical significance of John Wesley. She set up her own household in Notting Hill and in the following years she helped her uncle Charles Darwin translate the works of Linnaeus as well as publishing an array of clear and precise articles on science, religion, philosophy, literature, and social reform. At her London home, Wedgwood also worked on "a history of the evolution of ethics in the great world civilizations, from earliest antiquity down to the scientific positivism and theological modernism of the mid-nineteenth century", which was published in 1888 as The Moral Ideal: a Historic Study, which she described as setting out her philosophy of history. The success of this work led to the republication of her novels.

Upon the death of her mother in 1889 she gave up her own house to care for her father. Five years later, she published a follow-up work to "The Moral Ideal" – "The Message of Israel" – with the aim of re-interpreting the Judaeic tradition critically in the light of ‘modernism’. In 1909 a collection of her major articles was published, called Nineteenth Century Teachers. She was also persuaded to work on a biography of her great-grandfather, which was finished after her death by Professor C. H. Herford.

Religion and later life

Throughout her life Wedgwood was interested in the boundaries between scientific knowledge and religious belief and was influenced by Harriet Martineau, George Eliot, James Martineau, Alexander John Scott, and Thomas Erskine. In her later years she donated extensively for the construction and extension of Church of England churches. She had been active in the anti-vivisection movement since the 1860s and was a friend of the leading anti-vivisectionist Frances Power Cobbe. She bequeathed much of her fortune to the cause upon her death on 26 November 1913.

Bibliography 
 An Old Debt (as Florence Dawson), 1858
 Framleigh Hall, 1858
 Life of John Wesley, 1870
 The Moral Ideal, 1888 and 1907
 The Message of Israel, 1894
 Nineteenth Century Teachers, 1909

References

External links 
 Frances Julia Wedgwood, 1833–1913 (Wedgwood, Snow) : Darwin Correspondence Project – with links to her letters to and from Charles Darwin.

1833 births
1913 deaths
Darwin–Wedgwood family
English feminists
Writers from London
English women novelists
Women biographers
British women historians
English literary critics
English women non-fiction writers
English deaf people